Edward John "Ned" Roberts (1867 – 14 June 1940) was a Welsh international rugby union fullback who played club rugby for Llanelli and international rugby for Wales.

Rugby career
Roberts first international cap was gained in the opening game of the 1888 Home Nations Championship. The Welsh selectors had chosen two different fullbacks in the last two internationals, since Harry Bowen, a fellow Llanelli player, had face England in early 1887. With England withdrawn from the tournament, Wales faced Scotland in the opening game at home at Newport's Rodney Parade.  The Welsh team held seven new caps and although lacking in experience, the team managed to kill the game after taking the lead when Thomas Pryce-Jenkins scored the match's only try.

Roberts was reselected at halfback for the very next Wales international, in the second and final Welsh game of the 1888 Championship, away to Ireland. Under the captaincy of Tom Clapp, the Welsh team faced an international opposition for the final time playing with three threequarters system, but lost heavily. Roberts was not part of the 1888 Wales team that faced the touring New Zealand Natives, but Roberts also failed to make the Llanelli team that faced the same tourists three days prior. In the opening game of the 1889 Home Nations Championship the fullback position was filled by Cardiff's Hugh 'Sawdust' Hughes, but the next game saw Roberts retake his place at fullback. Roberts was one of four Llanelli players that were brought into the squad, but he, Giotto Griffiths, Dan Griffiths and Tom Morgan would never play another international game. The Irish won the game with two tries, both scored by debut players.

International matches played
Wales (rugby union)
  1888, 1889
  1888

Bibliography

References 

1867 births
1940 deaths
Llanelli RFC players
Rugby union fullbacks
Rugby union players from Llanelli
Wales international rugby union players
Welsh rugby union players